Syamsol Sabtu (born 30 August 1985) is a Malaysian footballer who played for Petaling Jaya Rangers F.C. in the Malaysia FAM League.

One of the graduates from the U23 national team, Syamsol became involved in the senior team when U23 head coach B. Sathianathan was appointed the national team manager after the successful 2007 Merdeka Tournament, in which Syamsol started at left back for the final. He has since played in the 2010 World Cup qualifiers against Bahrain.

External links

Living people
1985 births
Malaysian footballers
People from Malacca
Malaysian people of Malay descent
Negeri Sembilan FA players
Association football midfielders
Malaysia international footballers